The Mohammed bin Rashid International Football Championship, also known as the Dubai Cup, was a friendly football tournament that took place in Dubai, United Arab Emirates. The competition is named after Mohammed bin Rashid Al Maktoum, Vice President and Prime Minister of the UAE and Ruler of Dubai.

The championship is an invitation-only tournament: "only clubs which are reigning or former champions of accredited national and international competitions and internationally respected for their achievements are considered". No exhibition matches are played and the tournament is conducted in strict accordance with FIFA regulations.

Champions

Cups by team 

  Benfica (2007) 1 time
  Internacional (2008) 1 time

See also
Dubai Challenge Cup
Match World Cup

References

External links 
 Sport Club Internacional - Official Website
 Competition official website

 
Emirati football friendly trophies